Leutenheim is a commune in the Bas-Rhin department in Grand Est in north-eastern France.

History
In eighth- and ninth-century records the village appears as Lithaim.

In around 1140 Königsbrück Abbey was founded here, a Cistercian nunnery, dissolved during the French Revolution.

Before the Rhine was channeled, the landscape here was marshy and criss-crossed by branches of the river. Accordingly, the settlement is constructed on warfts.

See also
 Communes of the Bas-Rhin department

References

Communes of Bas-Rhin
Bas-Rhin communes articles needing translation from French Wikipedia